The ANA motorcycle was manufactured by Martin J Shelley at the ANA Cycle Works in Rathdowne Street, Carlton North, Melbourne, Australia between 1910 and 1919. The ANA used a wide variety of different engines: Fafnir, JAP Precision, Abingdon King Dick, as well as Sturmey-Archer gearboxes.

See also
List of motorcycles of the 1910s

References

External links
Museum of Victoria photo of ANA motorcycle from 1922
Power Dirt Bikes
A.N.A.

Motorcycle manufacturers of Australia
Motorcycles of Australia
Motorcycles introduced in the 1910s